Joseph Alston "Stoney" Wise (October 29, 1904 – September 23, 1984) was a Canadian ice hockey player who competed in the 1932 Winter Olympics.

In 1932 Wise was a member of the Winnipeg Hockey Club which won the World Championships and Olympic gold medal for Canada. He played five matches and scored two goal.

References

External links
Aliston Wise's profile at databaseOlympics
Alston Wise's profile at the Canadian Olympic Committee
Aliston Wise's profile at Sports Reference.com

1904 births
1984 deaths
Canadian ice hockey left wingers
Ice hockey players at the 1932 Winter Olympics
Olympic gold medalists for Canada
Olympic ice hockey players of Canada
Winnipeg Hockey Club players
Olympic medalists in ice hockey
Medalists at the 1932 Winter Olympics